The Italian Federation of Agroindustrial Workers (FLAI) is a trade union representing workers in the food and agriculture sectors in Italy.

The union was founded in 1988, when the National Federation of Italian Agricultural Labourers and Employees merged with the Italian Federation of Sugar, Food Industry and Tobacco Workers.  Like its predecessors, it affiliated to the Italian General Confederation of Labour.  By 1998, it had 314,552 members, of whom 79% worked in agriculture, and the remainder in food.

General Secretaries
1988: Angelo Lana
1992: Gianfranco Benzi
2000: Franco Chiriaco
2008: Stefania Crogi
2016: Ivana Galli
2019: Giovanni Mininni

External links

References

Agriculture and forestry trade unions
Food processing trade unions
Trade unions established in 1988
Trade unions in Italy